Count Panzutti (Conte di Panzutti) is an 18th-century Italian hereditary title, famously held by Fortunato and Guillaume de Félice. 
The title was passed by decree by the Contessa di Panzutti who held it "suo jure" as instructed in the 1st Count's will to Fortunato Felice in 1756, and has continued being inherited in such a manner to the present day. The heir apparent of the Contadi is styled Vicomte (Viscount) or Vicomtesse (Viscountess) Yverdon.

Counts Panzutti
H Ill. H Giuseppe Felipe Augusto di Panzutti, 1st Count Panzutti (1720–1756)
H Ill. H Fortunato Bartolommeo de Félice, 2nd Count Panzutti (1723–1789)
H Ill. H Fortuné-Bernard de Félice, 3rd Count Panzutti (1760–1832)
H Ill. H Guillame Adam de Félice, 4th Count Panzutti (1803–1871)
H Ill. H Henri François Louis Gabriel Guisan de Félice (1837–1895), 5th Count Panzutti (1837–1895)
H Ill. H Jules Louis Georges Samson Berdez de Félice, 6th Count Panzutti (b. 1858–1925)
H Ill. H Philippe Grin de Félice (I), 7th Count Panzutti (1893–??)
H Ill. H Philippe Grin de Félice (II), 8th Count Panzutti (1918–1998)
H Ill. H Philippe Grin de Félice-Ruttley (III), 9th Count Panzutti (b. 1954)

As the title is held 'suo jure', the Heir Apparents are the present holder's children, chosen upon the present holder's death:
 Olivia Gabriella Celimène de Félice, Viscountess Yverdon (b. 1987)
 Mathieu Philippe Tancrede de Félice, Viscount Yverdon (b. 1989)
 Marie-Sophie Yolande Laetitia de Félice, Viscountess Yverdon (b. 1994)

Further reading
https://www.defelice-estates.com/
History of the Counts Panzutti
Pédézert, Jean. Souvenirs et études (1888 edition) – Chap.II – Paris: Grassart 1888
Félice et al. Mémoires de la Société oeconomique de Berne, vol 4., 1764
Swiss & Savoy Nobility Brennand's European Nobility

References

Countships
Lists of counts
Counts of Italy
Swiss nobility
Lists of Italian nobility